St Andrews Road railway station is located near to St Andrew's Road and serves a large industrial area near to Avonmouth, Bristol, England. The station and all trains serving it are operated by Great Western Railway.

All trains serving it are operated by and the station is managed by Great Western Railway. DB Cargo UK also operate coal trains to the Aberthaw power stations in Wales on an 'as required' basis and formerly to the now closed Didcot A Power Station from the adjacent bulk freight terminal.

For many years, it has been the least used railway station in Bristol.

History
The station was opened in March 1917  for workmen, but closed on 13 November 1922. It reopened on 30 June 1924 as a public station.

For many years the station had an infrequent service in each direction, but this was increased to hourly in the December 2021 timetable change.

Service
All services at St Andrews Road are operated by Great Western Railway using  Turbo DMUs.

The typical off-peak service in trains per hour is:
 1 tph to 
 1 tph to 

References in popular culture 

St Andrew's Road station was featured in the Channel 4 series Paul Merton's Secret Stations Season 1 Episode 2 broadcast on 8 May 2016. This series features British comedian Paul Merton visiting various request stop railway stations around Britain.

See also
Great Western Railway
List of all UK railway stations
Public transport in Bristol

References

External links 

A video of coal being loaded at St Andrew's Road
2019 YouTube video by Geoff Marshall about the station

Railway stations in Bristol
DfT Category F2 stations
Former Great Western Railway stations
Railway stations in Great Britain opened in 1917
Railway stations in Great Britain closed in 1922
Railway stations in Great Britain opened in 1924
Railway stations served by Great Western Railway
Avonmouth
Severn Beach Line